Chenxiang Highway is a station on Line 11 of the Shanghai Metro in Shanghai, located between  and  stations in the city's suburban Jiading District. It was conceived to be included with the first phase of Line 11 as Universal Park Station, dependent on the expansion program of the adjacent Shanghai Universal theme park. However, with the uncertainly in the viability of the park expansion project, reservations were made in Line 11's alignment to allow for the station to be added at a later date as an infill station while the rest of the Phase 1 opened in 2009. Shanghai Universal closed in 2000 due to financial issues and low patronage, leaving the new infill station unnecessary. Planned redevelopment of the Shanghai Universal lands into dense residential and commercial properties reintroduced the need for a metro station to serve the area. The start of the infill station project was approved in 2014 now as Chenxiang Highway station. Construction of the station started in 2018 and it was opened on August 25, 2020.

Notes

References

Line 11, Shanghai Metro
Shanghai Metro stations in Jiading District
Railway stations in China opened in 2020